The BBC Radio 4 programme Desert Island Discs invites celebrities to become "castaways" and choose eight pieces of music that they would take to an imaginary desert island, where they will be marooned indefinitely. During the period listed here, the later rule allowing castaways a book and a luxury item had not yet been introduced and as such, choices have not been listed.

1942

1943

1944

1945

1946

References

Episodes (1942-1946)
1940s in the United Kingdom
Desert